Mike Fritzthadus Jones (born February 10, 1967) is an American former professional basketball player.

High school career
Born in Phoenix, Arizona, Jones was named a First-Team Parade All-American, while at Oak Hill Academy, in Mouth of Wilson, Virginia.

College career
Jones played college basketball at Auburn University, in Auburn, Alabama, with the Auburn Tigers.

Professional career
Jones was selected by the Milwaukee Bucks in the third round (63rd pick overall) of the 1988 NBA Draft. He played for the Jersey Shore Bucs of the United States Basketball League (USBL). He then moved to Europe to play with the Greek club PAOK in 1988. In 1990, he played with the Greek club Aris at the 1990 Euroleague Final Four.

Jones won the French League championship in 1992, and the French Cup title in 1991 and 1992, while playing with Pau Orthez. In the 1992-93 season, he played with FC Barcelona in both the Korać Cup and the Spanish ACB League.

Jones also played for Cholet Cedex Basket, CB Murcia, Hapoel Holon, Peñarol Mar del Plata, the Omaha Racers (CBA), Apollon Limassol, Welcome Montevideo, Asteras Limassol, and Digenis Akritas Morphou.

References

External links 
basketpedya.com
fibaeurope.com
elan-bearnais.fr

1967 births
Living people
American expatriate basketball people in Argentina
American expatriate basketball people in Cyprus
American expatriate basketball people in France
American expatriate basketball people in Greece
American expatriate basketball people in Israel
American expatriate basketball people in Spain
American expatriate basketball people in Uruguay
American men's basketball players
Apollon Limassol BC players
Aris B.C. players
Auburn Tigers men's basketball players
Basketball players from Phoenix, Arizona
CB Murcia players
Cholet Basket players
Club Atlético Welcome basketball players
Élan Béarnais players
FC Barcelona Bàsquet players
Greek Basket League players
Hapoel Holon players
Israeli Basketball Premier League players
Liga ACB players
Milwaukee Bucks draft picks
P.A.O.K. BC players
Parade High School All-Americans (boys' basketball)
Peñarol de Mar del Plata basketball players
Small forwards
American expatriate basketball people in the Philippines
Magnolia Hotshots players
Philippine Basketball Association imports